Chandrashekhar Krishnarao Bawankule is President of Bharatiya Janata Party, Maharashtra and Member of Maharashtra Legislative Council representing Nagpur Local Authorities  on 2nd January 2022. He was member of the 13th Maharashtra Legislative Assembly & Minister for Energy, New and Renewable Energy Maharashtra, State Excise, and also appointed Nagpur Guardian Minister on 26 December 2014.

He represented the Kamthi Assembly Constituency and belongs to the Bharatiya Janata Party (BJP). It was his third term as Member of Legislative Assembly since 2004, 2009 & 2014. Due to baseless allegations of corruption Bawankule was not given ticket for contesting Assembly election by BJP, it was given to his wife Jyoti, she filled the form for 2019 assembly election from Kamthi, but at the last moment after her form filling, Jyoti was denied AB form by BJP. He was Secretary of Bhartiya Janata Party, Maharashtra State Unit in Devendra Fadnavis team in 2012. In cabinet expansion he was given state excise department charge on 10 July 2016.

Background and family
Chandrashekhar Bawankule was born in Kamthi into a Marathi Teli family.

Chandrashekhar Bawankule married Jyoti. He has a daughter Payal married to Lokesh Ashtankar and son Sanket married to Anushka.

Early life
Bawankule was born & brought up in a farmers' family with a non-political background. Koradi located near Nagpur is the place where he pursued his higher education in the stream of Science & completed first year.

Political career
Bawankule's career commenced in earnest in the early nineties, he started “Chhatrapati Sena” and continued its social work till 1994 without any self-interest. Then he joined Bhartiya Janata Party under leadership of Late Gopinath Munde & Nitin Gadkari in 1995 and became Vice President of the Bharatiya Janata Yuva Morcha a youth wing of the BJP in Maharashtra in 1995.

In 1997 & 2002, Bawankule was elected as a District Council Member. In 2004, he was elected to the Maharashtra state assembly for the first time.

Positions held

Within BJP

President, Bharatiya Janata Party, Maharashtra, Since 12th August 2022
Vice President, BJYM Nagpur District (1995)
General Secretary, BJP Nagpur District
President, Bhartiya Janata Party, Nagpur District
Secretary, Maharashtra BJP State Unit (2012-2014)

Legislative

Member, Zilha Parishad, Nagpur (1997 & 2002)
Member, Maharashtra Legislative Assembly - Since 2004-2019
Cabinet Minister Maharashtra, Energy, New & Renewable Energy
Guardian Minister of Nagpur
Member, Maharashtra Legislative Council - Since 2nd Jan., 2022

References

People from Nagpur district
Living people
Maharashtra MLAs 2004–2009
Maharashtra MLAs 2009–2014
1969 births
Maharashtra MLAs 2014–2019
Bharatiya Janata Party politicians from Maharashtra
Marathi politicians